Andrew Stuart Harrison (born 7 February 1957 in Edmonton, London) is an English actor.

Career
Andrew Harrison began his career in repertory theatre playing the lead roles in A Chorus of Disapproval and Serious Money at the Northcott Theatre, Exeter. His West End (London) debut came with a role in Sir Michael Hordern's Trelawny of the 'Wells'.

Andrew has numerous TV credits include The Bill, Miss Marple, and Birds of a Feather, and the films A Sea Change and An Ideal Husband. He contributes regularly to BBC Radio. In television, Andrew is perhaps best known for his roles in Beyond Narnia and Florence Nightingale.

Filmography
 2011 King James' Bible as Bishop Lancelot Andrews
 2010 Derelict as Governor Phillips
 2010 Summer in Transylvania Dr. Tempest
 2009 Dorian Gray as House Seller
 2008 Home as Dad
 2005 Florence Nightingale as Lord Palmerston
 2005 C.S. Lewis: Beyond Narnia as Albert Lewis, The Father
 2005 Pepys as Clerk of the Court
 2000 The Nine Lives of Tomas Katz as Voice
 1999 An Ideal Husband as Algy

References

External links
Biography at Actorum Ltd

English male film actors
English male television actors
1957 births
Living people
Male actors from London
People from Edmonton, London
20th-century English male actors
21st-century English male actors